The 1903 Dartmouth football team was an American football team that represented Dartmouth College as an independent during the 1903 college football season. In its first season under head coach Fred Folsom, the team compiled a 9–1 record, shut out eight of ten opponents, and outscored all opponents by a total of 242 to 23. Myron E. Witham was the team captain. The team played its home games at Alumni Oval in Hanover, New Hampshire.

Schedule

References

Dartmouth
Dartmouth Big Green football seasons
Dartmouth football